The Canadian Secondary School Rowing Association (CSSRA) is an organization which governs high school rowing in Canada. The CSSRA has hosted the main high school rowing event, known as the CSSRA Championships (also known as "Schoolboy") since 1945. In 2020, the regatta was cancelled due to concerns surrounding the COVID-19 pandemic.  Schoolboy is held annually the first weekend of June (Friday through Sunday) in St. Catharines, Ontario, Canada at the Royal Canadian Henley Regatta course. The event is open to high schools around North America. The event is the largest high school regatta in Ontario, as well as Canada. Evidence of this is that crews have been coming from as far as British Columbia (Canada), as well as the United States, and even Mexico. Each race is over the 2000 metre course, the same as is used in the World Championships and the Olympics, but unlike the 3 to 8 km head races usually raced in the autumn. Heats are held on Friday, semi-finals on Saturday and finals on Sunday.

Several Olympic rowers, including Buffy-Lynne Williams (née Alexander) have rowed at Schoolboy. Buffy participated while a student of Holy Cross Catholic Secondary School in St. Catharines.

See also
List of rowing blades

External links
https://www.cssra.org

Rowing governing bodies
Rowing in Canada
High school sport in Canada
Scholastic rowing